Revelation Space is a 2000 science fiction novel by Welsh author Alastair Reynolds. It was the first novel (but not first published work of fiction) set in Reynolds's eponymous universe. The novel reflects Reynolds's professional background: he has a PhD in astronomy and worked for many years for the European Space Agency. It was short listed for the  2000 BSFA and Arthur C. Clarke Awards.

Summary
Revelation Space begins with three seemingly unrelated narrative strands that merge as the novel progresses. This plot structure is characteristic of many of Reynolds's works.

The first strand centres around Dan Sylveste, beginning in the year 2551. Sylveste is an archaeologist excavating the remains of the long-dead Amarantin race. Over the course of decades, Sylveste learns that the Amarantin may have become technologically sophisticated before their sun destroyed life on the planet Resurgam nearly a million years prior.

The next strand centres around Ilia Volyova aboard the Nostalgia for Infinity, a large ship capable of interstellar travel. Volyova and the other members of her skeleton crew wish to find Sylveste because they believe he can help them with their captain, who has been infected with the Melding Plague, a nanotech virus that attacks human cells and machine implants to pervert them into grotesque combinations.

The third strand focuses on Ana Khouri, an assassin living on the planet Yellowstone (in the Epsilon Eridani system). Khouri is hired by a mysterious figure known as the Mademoiselle to assassinate Sylveste.

With help from the Mademoiselle, Khouri infiltrates the crew of the Nostalgia for Infinity as it reaches orbit around Yellowstone, knowing that they will then travel to Resurgam. The Nostalgia for Infinity arrives in orbit around Resurgam in 2566. Desperate to secure Sylveste's expertise to help cure her captain, Volyova and the other two members of the ship's ruling triumvirate (Sajaki and Hegazi) threaten the defenceless Resurgam civilisation, prompting its rulers to turn Sylveste over to them.

Once aboard, however, Sylveste informs the triumvirs that he has antimatter bombs hidden inside the implants in his artificial eyes that could destroy the Nostalgia for Infinity. He then agrees to attempt to cure their captain in exchange for a trip to Cerberus, a mysterious nearby planet that he believes holds the secret to the truth of Amarantin civilisation. They soon discover that Cerberus is actually a massive beacon aimed at alerting a machine sentience of the appearance of new star-faring cultures so that it can destroy them. It is that sentience, Sylveste belatedly realises, that caused the demise of the Amarantin.

Publication history
This was Alastair Reynolds's first published novel, and was published in a relatively small initial print run in the United Kingdom. It subsequently became a collectible first edition.

Reception
Thomas M. Wagner of SF Reviews wrote that "despite my disappointment, images and bits and pieces of the novel simply would not get out of my head. This is saying something, since, with the volume of SF and fantasy I read, I do not exactly retain an eidetic memory of everything I've read that I can call up in a second or two unless the book literally bowled me over. But in the case of Revelation Space, two and three years later I still could remember the opening scene in the archaeological dig on the lonely planet of Resurgam with remarkable clarity. The dark, eerie corridors of the vast starship Nostalgia for Infinity still brought haunting images to mind."

A Dragonsworn review notes "there's plenty of beautifully scripted action sequences, and gorgeous descriptions—especially where the Nostalgia for Infinity is concerned. Reynolds paints a vivid picture of a haunting machine in decline, and a crew that may as well be ghosts." while observing the lack of character development.

The Revelation Space Trilogy was listed in Damien Broderick's book Science Fiction: The 101 Best Novels 1985-2010.

See also
 Revelation Space universe

References

External links
 Revelation Space at the ISFDB
 SFNet review
 SF Site review
 Infinity Plus review
 Russ Allbery review
 SF Signal review

 
2000 British novels
2000 debut novels
2000 science fiction novels
British science fiction novels
Fiction about consciousness transfer
Fiction set around Epsilon Eridani
Novels by Alastair Reynolds
Space opera novels
Victor Gollancz Ltd books
Xenoarchaeology in fiction